Karl Torsten Kumfeldt (4 January 1886 – 2 May 1966) was a Swedish water polo goalkeeper and breaststroke swimmer. He competed in water polo at the 1908, 1912 and 1920 Summer Olympics and won one silver and two bronze medals. In 1908 he also took part in the 200 m breaststroke event.

Biography
Kumfeldt won seven national water polo titles with his club Stockholm KK. Between 1910 and 1912 he was secretary of the Swedish Swimming Federation, and spent much effort on preparing swimming venues for the 1912 Summer Olympics in Stockholm.

See also
 Sweden men's Olympic water polo team records and statistics
 Dual sport and multi-sport Olympians
 List of Olympic medalists in water polo (men)
 List of men's Olympic water polo tournament goalkeepers

References

External links
 

1886 births
1966 deaths
Sportspeople from Örebro
Swedish male water polo players
Water polo goalkeepers
Swedish male breaststroke swimmers
Olympic water polo players of Sweden
Olympic swimmers of Sweden
Swimmers at the 1908 Summer Olympics
Water polo players at the 1908 Summer Olympics
Water polo players at the 1912 Summer Olympics
Water polo players at the 1920 Summer Olympics
Olympic silver medalists for Sweden
Olympic bronze medalists for Sweden
Olympic medalists in water polo
Medalists at the 1920 Summer Olympics
Medalists at the 1912 Summer Olympics
Medalists at the 1908 Summer Olympics
Stockholms KK water polo players